Grave Creek is a stream in the U.S. state of West Virginia.

Grave Creek was named for a nearby Native American burial site known as the Grave Creek Mound.

See also
List of rivers of West Virginia

References

Rivers of Marshall County, West Virginia
Rivers of West Virginia